Mark Jay Layton (born 16 October 1957) is a Welsh professional darts player who plays in World Darts Federation events.

In 2018, he qualified for the 2019 BDO World Darts Championship.

Darts career
Layton four televised majors on the PDC UK Open in Last 64 he losing to Dave Chisnall 7–9 (legs).

In 2013, Layton he qualified for the 2013 Winmau World Masters who lost to Ross Montgomery of Scotland 1–3 (sets).

Layton wins of the 2015 Cheshire Open he beating John Bowles in Quarter finals, Alan Tabern in Semi finals and former Lakeside World Champion & 2 times World Masters Champion Stephen Bunting by 6–4 (legs).

Layton winner of the 2016 Gwynedd Open he defeating Simon Hardy of England 5–2 (legs)

Layton won the 2017 Malta Open he defeated Joe Davis of England by 6–2 (legs).

In January 2019, Layton he lost to Wayne Warren by 0–3 (sets) of the 2019 BDO World Darts Championship.

In 2020, Layton joining the PDC Tour Card UK Qualifying in Last 64 he beating Tony Newell & lost to UK Open and Players Championship Quarter Finals Robbie Green.

World Championship Performances

BDO
 2019: 1st Round (lost to Wayne Warren 0-3) (sets)

References

External links

1957 births
Living people
Welsh darts players
British Darts Organisation players
Sportspeople from Swansea
People from Llandrindod Wells
Sportspeople from Powys